Pettai which means place or colony in the Tamil may refer to:

India

Tamil Nadu
 Pettai, Cuddalore, a village in Chidambaram Taluk, Cuddalore District
 Pettai, Tirunelveli, an industrial suburb of the city of Tirunelveli, Tirunelveli District
 Pettai Rural, a village south of Pettai, Tirunelveli, in Tirunelveli Taluka, Tirunelveli District  
 Pettai, Villupuram, a panchayat village in Gingee Taluk,  Villupuram District
 Palavedu Pettai, a village outside Chennai, in Ambattur Taluk, Thiruvallur District, See Siragu Montessori School#Nadaipathai Pookkal Program (Flowers of the Pavement)

Pondicherry
 Pettai, Karaikal, a panchayat village in Thirunallar Commune Panchayat, Karaikal District